The Rocketdyne S-3D is an American liquid rocket engine produced by Rocketdyne between 1956 and 1961 for use on the PGM-19 Jupiter and PGM-17 Thor missiles, and the Juno II rocket. Its design was used later as the basis for the H-1 rocket engine of the Saturn I, and the Rolls-Royce RZ.2 of the Blue Streak.

It belongs to the LR79 engine family.

References

S-3D
Rocket engines of the United States
Rocket engines using the gas-generator cycle